Yassine Boughanem (born 24 January 1994) is a Moroccan-Belgian Muay Thai fighter, who has been professionally competing since 2011. He is the current WKN World Super Heavyweight Muay Thai champion.

He is the former WBC Muaythai World Super Heavyweight champion, successfully defending this title three times, and the WPMF World Heavyweight champion with two title defenses.

Yassine is the younger brother of Muay Thai world champion Youssef Boughanem.

Muay Thai career
He participated in the 2016 Super Muaythai four man Heavyweight Tournament. After dispatching Liam John McKendry in the semifinal by a first round TKO, he faced Steven Banks in the finals. Boughanem once again won by a first round knockout.

Steven Banks and Yassine Boughanem met once more a year later, during the Phoenix 5 in the famed Rajadamnern Stadium, this time fighting for the vacant WBC Muaythai Super Heavyweight title. Boughanem was able to push the faced again his opponent and won both the fight and title by a unanimous decision.

At Phoenix 8 Boughanem made his first title defense against James McSweeney. Boughanem dominated throughout most of the fight, controlling the center of the ring, and won the fight by a unanimous decision (49-48, 49-48 and 49-47). During Phoenix 10 Yassine made the second WBC Muaythai Super Heavyweight title defense, against Jurjendal. Boughanem was able to win a unanimous decision.

Boughanem fought for the World Super Heavyweight Muay Thai title during PSM Fight Night, while also putting his WBC title on the line, with his opponent being the Portuguese native Bruno Susano. The fight was stopped by a doctor in at the end of the second round, as Susano sustained a cut on his forehead which rendered him unable to continue to fight.

Yassine participated in the 2019 PSM Fight Night tournament, being the defending WBC Muaythai super heavyweight champion. In the semi finals he scored a TKO victory over Mohan Bouzidi, as his corner stopped the fight at the end of the first round. In the final bout he managed a first round knockout over Sofian Laidouni. The Belgian Federation declared the fight a no contest, as Yassine hit Sofian with a strike as he was falling to the canvas in a knockdown. The WBC Muaythai however, count the fight as a win and title defense for Boughanem.

Mixed martial arts career
Boughanem made his mixed martial arts debut fellow debutante Jacky Jeanne at Ares FC 3 on February 3, 2022. He lost the fight by a second-round technical knockout after a dislocation of his left shoulder.

Boughanem is booked to face Fabio Kwasi at Ares FC 7: Abdouraguimov vs. Amoussou on June 25, 2022.

Championship and accomplishments
Super Muaythai
2016 Super Muaythai Heavyweight Tournament Winner
World Professional Muaythai Federation
WPMF World Heavyweight Championship
Two successful title defenses
World Boxing Council Muaythai
WBC Muaythai World Super Heavyweight Championship
Three successful title defenses
World Kickboxing Network
WKN World Super Heavyweight Championship

Mixed martial arts record
 

|-
|Loss
|align=center|0–1
|Jacky Jeanne
|TKO (retirement)
|Ares FC 3
|
|align=center|2
|align=center|0:59
|Paris, France
|
|-
|}

Muay Thai record

|-  bgcolor="#c5d2ea"
| 2019-11-16|| No contest ||align=left| Sofian Laidouni || PSM Fight Night 2 || Brussels, Belgium || Decision (Unanimous) || 3 || 3:00
|-
! style=background:white colspan=9 |
|-  bgcolor="#CCFFCC"
| 2019-11-16|| Win ||align=left| Mohand Bouzidi || PSM Fight Night 2 || Brussels, Belgium || TKO (Corner stoppage) || 1 || 3:00
|-
! style=background:white colspan=9 |
|-  bgcolor="#CCFFCC"
| 2019-5-11|| Win ||align=left| Ion Grigore || Fight Event || Brussels, Belgium || TKO || 3 ||
|-  bgcolor="#CCFFCC"
| 2019-4-22|| Win ||align=left| Bruno Susano || PSM Fight Night || Brussels, Belgium || TKO || 2 || 
|-
! style=background:white colspan=9 |
|-  bgcolor="#CCFFCC"
| 2018-10-13|| Win ||align=left| Jurjendal || Phoenix 10 || Brussels, Belgium || Decision (Unanimous) || 5 || 3:00
|-
! style=background:white colspan=9 |
|-  bgcolor="#CCFFCC"
| 2018-5-22|| Win ||align=left| James McSweeney || Phoenix 8 Bangkok (Lumpinee) || Bangkok, Thailand || Decision (Unanimous) || 5 || 3:00
|-
! style=background:white colspan=9 |
|-  bgcolor="#CCFFCC"
| 2018-2-26|| Win ||align=left| Steven Banks || Phoenix 5 Bangkok (Rajadamnern) || Bangkok, Thailand || Decision (Unanimous) || 5 || 3:00
|-
! style=background:white colspan=9 |
|-  bgcolor="#CCFFCC"
| 2018-2-10|| Win ||align=left| Imad el Moutahi || King Of Brussels || Brussels, Belgium || TKO (Doctor stoppage) || 1 || 3:00
|-  bgcolor="#CCFFCC"
| 2017-12-9|| Win ||align=left| Daniel Sam || Golden Fight || Levallois-Perret, France || Decision (Unanimous) || 3 || 3:00
|-  bgcolor="#fbb"
| 2017-10-28|| Loss ||align=left| Ciryl Gane || Duel 2 || Paris, France || Decision (Unanimous) || 5 || 3:00
|-  bgcolor="#CCFFCC"
| 2017-6-29 || Win ||align=left| Alexandru Lungu || Best Of Siam XI || Paris, France || KO || 1 || 3:00
|-  bgcolor="#CCFFCC"
| 2016-10-29 || Win ||align=left| Benz RSM Academy || Best Of Siam IX || Paris, France || Decision (Unanimous) || 3 || 3:00
|-  bgcolor="#CCFFCC"
| 2016-8-28 || Win ||align=left| Steven Banks || Super Muaythai || Bangkok, Thailand || KO || 1 || 
|-
! style=background:white colspan=9 |
|-  bgcolor="#CCFFCC"
| 2016-8-28 || Win ||align=left| Liam John McKendry || Super Muaythai || Bangkok, Thailand || TKO || 1 || 
|-
! style=background:white colspan=9 |
|-  bgcolor="#fbb"
| 2016-5-27 || Loss ||align=left| Benz RSM Academy || Best Of Siam 8 (Rajadamnern) || Bangkok, Thailand || Decision (Unanimous) || 5 || 3:00
|-
! style=background:white colspan=9 |
|-  bgcolor="#CCFFCC"
| 2016-4-30 || Win ||align=left| Samih Bachar || Kerner Thai || Paris, France || Decision (Split) || 3 || 3:00
|-  bgcolor="#CCFFCC"
| 2015-12-11 || Win ||align=left| Yüksel Ayaydın || Best Of Siam 7 || Paris, France || Decision (Unanimous) || 3 || 3:00
|-  bgcolor="#fbb"
| 2015-10-10 || Loss ||align=left| Mickael Yapi || Shock Muay 7 || Saint-Denis, France || TKO || 4 ||
|-  bgcolor="#CCFFCC"
| 2015-6-19 || Win ||align=left| Thomas Alizier || Best Of Siam 6 || Paris, France || Decision (Unanimous) || 3 || 3:00
|-  bgcolor="#CCFFCC"
| 2015-3-6 || Win ||align=left| Panom TopkingBoxing || Friday 6 March || Pattaya, Thailand || Decision (Unanimous) || 5 || 3:00
|-  bgcolor="#fbb"
| 2015- || Loss ||align=left| Avatar Tor.Morsri ||  || Thailand || Decision|| 5 || 3:00
|-  bgcolor="#CCFFCC"
| 2014-10-10 || Win ||align=left| Malik Aliane || Chawang Stadium || Ko Samui, Thailand || KO || 3 ||
|-  bgcolor="#CCFFCC"
| 2014-5-10 || Win ||align=left| Fahsai || Suk Singpatong + Sitnumnoi || Phuket, Thailand || KO || 2 ||
|-  bgcolor="#CCFFCC"
| 2014-4-19 || Win ||align=left| Kongjak Sor Tuantong || Suk Singpatong + Sitnumnoi || Phuket, Thailand || Decision (Unanimous) || 5 || 3:00
|-  bgcolor="#CCFFCC"
| 2014-2-7 || Win ||align=left| Panom TopkingBoxing || Super Big Match || Phuket, Thailand || Decision (Unanimous) || 5 || 3:00
|-  bgcolor="#CCFFCC"
| 2014-1-19 || Win ||align=left| Kongjak Sor Tuantong || Sunday Championship Night || Phuket, Thailand || Decision (Unanimous) || 5 || 3:00
|-  bgcolor="#CCFFCC"
| 2014-1-1 || Win ||align=left| Berneung TopkingBoxing || Wednesday Championship Night || Phuket, Thailand || KO || 5 ||
|-  bgcolor="#CCFFCC"
| 2014-12-4 || Win ||align=left| Kiatchai Phuket Top Team || Wednesday Championship Night || Phuket, Thailand || Decision (Unanimous) || 5 || 3:00
|-  bgcolor="#CCFFCC"
| 2013-1-20 || Win ||align=left| Kiatchai Kiatchaimuaythai Gym || Wednesday Championship Night || Phuket, Thailand || Decision (Unanimous) || 5 || 3:00
|-
| colspan=9 | Legend:

See also
 List of male kickboxers

References

Belgian kickboxers
Heavyweight kickboxers
1994 births
Living people
Belgian Muay Thai practitioners
Sportspeople from Brussels
Belgian sportspeople of Moroccan descent
Belgian male mixed martial artists